Changaspis is an extinct genus of trilobite that lived during the lower Cambrian in what is now China.

References

Sources 
 Trilobite info (Sam Gon III)
 Photo L. Placenta

External links
 Trilobite info (Sam Gon III)

Corynexochida genera
Oryctocephalidae
Cambrian trilobites
Prehistoric animals of China